Jungle is a 2000 Indian survival thriller film produced and directed by Ram Gopal Varma. The movie is about a group of bandits, led by forest brigand, "Durga Narayan Chaudhary" (Sushant Singh), that hold a bunch of tourists hostage. It stars Suniel Shetty as Shivraj, the head of police, Urmila Matondkar as Anu Malhotra, one of the hostages, and Fardeen Khan as Siddhu, her love interest. The ensemble cast film has received positive reviews upon release and was declared a Hit.

Jungle received many accolades and nominations, including Filmfare Award for Best Background Score at the 46th Filmfare Awards. For his performance, Sushant Singh won an IIFA Award and Zee Cine Award for Best Performance in a Negative Role.

Plot
Anu Malhotra (Urmila Matondkar) and Siddharth "Siddhu" Mishra (Fardeen Khan) are in love with each other and would like to get married. Anu is ready to inform her parents about her future life-partner, but everything is put on hold, as the family decides to go out on a group safari-like expedition. Siddhu decides to go incognito also. The group gets to view wildlife from fairly close distances.

Tragedy strikes when the group (except Siddhu) is kidnapped by the Bandit Durga Narayan Choudhary (Sushant Singh) and his gang. The bandits commit atrocities on the kidnapped people and finally behead one of the women in order to terrorize the government and extract ransom as well as release of one of their men who is in police custody. Once their demands are met, the bandits release remaining hostages, except Anu, whom the chief Durga Narayan Choudhary has started liking. This is unacceptable by his girlfriend Bali (Kashmera Shah), the only female bandit of the gang. When Siddhu does not find Anu among the released hostages, he sends the illegal arms supplier Dorai (Makrand Deshpande) to request Durga Narayan Choudhary for Anu's release. He secretly follows Dorai and finally reaches Anu. In the ensuing commotion, he is able to run away with her, with the bandits in their pursuit. They keep searching their way out of the dense forest.

Meanwhile, the goons started to reduce in numbers as they get shot one by one during repeated police encounters. Finally, Durga is the only one left. Still mad about Anu, he searches for her. He is about to take Anu away once more but is intercepted by Shivraj (Sunil Shetty), whom he eventually murders, but finally Siddhu beats up Durga and he is arrested. He re-unites with Anu and the movie ends on a happy note.

Cast

 Sunil Shetty as Shivraj Mittal
 Fardeen Khan as Siddharth "Siddhu" Mishra
 Urmila Matondkar as Anu Malhotra
 Makrand Deshpande as Doraiswamy 'Madrasi'
 Sushant Singh as Durga Narayan Chaudhary
 Kashmera Shah as Bali
 Himanshu Malik as Pawan Birla
 Raju Kher as Mr. Shekhar Malhotra
 Swati Chitnis as Mrs. Sonia Malhotra
 Rajpal Yadav as Sippa
 Vijay Raaz as Deshu
 Ram Awana as Jinda
 Gurinder Makna as Makna
 Sanjay Kumar as Phoda
 Anil Yadav as Bhura
 Avtar Gill as Minister
 Nawazuddin Siddiqui as Khabri Jaiswal

Reception

Critical Reception
Jungle received generally positive reviews from critics. Taran Adarsh of Bollywood Hungama gave it 3.5 out of 5 stars and wrote, "Director Ram Gopal Varma deserves a pat on his back for choosing an offbeat subject, going in for a star cast that will not make the distributors' heart beat faster and handling the subject with utmost honesty. To state that this is his finest effort, better than Shiva, Rangeela and Satya, would be absolutely right ... Every character in Jungle has a well-defined role, which is why every performance stands out at the end of the day." Aparajita Saha of Rediff said, "Jungle is a movie where the violence is believable, the tension palpable, the emotions credible and the performances real."

Soundtrack
The music for the film was composed by Sandeep Chowta and Sameer penned the lyrics.

Awards and nominations

Notes

References

External links
 

2000 films
Films set in jungles
2000s Hindi-language films
Indian avant-garde and experimental films
Films directed by Ram Gopal Varma
Films scored by Sandeep Chowta
2000s avant-garde and experimental films